Yangzhen Area or Yang Town is an area and a town located within Shunyi District, Beijing, China. It shares border with Mulin and Longwantun Towns to its north, Zhang Town to its east, Dasungezhuang and Beiwu Towns to its south, Beisui and Nancai Towns to its west, and Beixiaoying Town to its northwest. As of 2020, it had a population of 64,578.

The settlement here was used to be called Mazhuang (马庄), but with the reign of Wanli Emperor, it was changed to Yangzhen due to the increasing influence of Yang family within the area.

History

Administrative divisions 

In 2021, Yangzhen Area consisted of 45 subdivisions, including 4 communities and 41 villages:

Transportation 
Yangzhen is approximately 1 hour by bus from downtown Beijing's Dongzhimen (东直门) long-distance bus terminal.

Gallery

See also 

 List of township-level divisions of Beijing

External links 
 Official website

References 

Towns in Beijing
Shunyi District
Areas of Beijing